African Giant is the fourth studio album by Nigerian singer Burna Boy. The album was released on July 26, 2019, by Spaceship Entertainment, Bad Habit, Atlantic Records and Warner Music. The album is a mixture of Afrobeats, Afrobeat, dancehall, pop and hip hop. It was produced primarily by Kel-P, along with production from Benjamz, Dre Skull and Skrillex, among others. The album features guest appearances from Jorja Smith, Jeremih, Damian Marley, Zlatan Ibile, Angelique Kidjo, Serani, M.anifest, YG and Future. It was supported by eight singles, including "On the Low", which won Viewers' Choice at the 2020 Soundcity MVP Awards Festival, "Killin Dem", which won Song of the Year at the 2020 Soundcity MVP Awards Festival, among other awards; and "Anybody", which Burna Boy performed on Jimmy Kimmel Live!.

The album received generally favorable reviews from music critics, who called it cohesive and praised Burna Boy for not diluting his sound. It was included in the year-end lists issued by several publications, including Billboard, Complex and Pitchfork. African Giant won Album of the Year at the 2019 All Africa Music Awards and was nominated for Best World Music Album at the 62nd Annual Grammy Awards. It was supported by the African Giant Returns tour, which commenced in Toronto in August 2019.

Background and recording
Burna Boy recorded songs for African Giant with Kel-P between August and November 2018. The latter told Revolt TV that he met the singer through a mutual friend in August. He said that they spent six weeks in a Lagos hotel room recording 23 songs for the album. The M.anifest-assisted track "Another Story" was recorded at a hotel in Ghana. The tracks "On the Low", "Gbona", "Omo", and "Spiritual" were all recorded on the same day. Burna Boy told Billboard magazine the album is his most personal yet, and would touch upon themes of Nigeria's political climate and violence in the region. The album was produced primarily by Kel P, along with production from Benjamz, Dre Skulls and Skrillex, among others. It features guest appearances from Jorja Smith, Jeremih, Damian Marley and Future, among others. African Giant was mixed in Los Angeles and London by Jesse Ray Ernster, a mixing engineer known for his collaboration with Kanye West.

The album's title was derived from Burna Boy's infamous outburst at Coachella's organizers regarding the placement of his name in a small font. Burna Boy held a private listening session for the album in Los Angeles. Photos and videos from the listening session were shared on social media. African Giant was initially announced as a 16-track album to be released in August 2019. In July 2019, Burna Boy was disclosed as Apple Music's Up Next artist. His inclusion into the program was accompanied by a Beats 1 interview with Julie Adenuga and a short documentary. In the same month, Burna Boy unveiled the album's artwork and release date. The artwork was inspired by Nigeria's first 10 naira note, which features Nigerian educationist Alvan Ikoku. The album's artwork also contains other symbolic elements, including serial style numbers representing his date of birth, images of him as a baby with his father and grandfather depicting generational transition, and a stack of gold coins suggesting a single African currency backed by gold.

Composition
African Giant is an Afrobeats, Afrobeat, dancehall, pop and hip hop album. On the album's opener and title track "African Giant", Burna Boy portrays himself as the poster boy in the fight against oppression. "Anybody" contains a sample of Angelique Kidjo's "We We". Pitchfork writer Alphonse Pierre praised the song's melody and said Burna Boy's best attribute is his vocal versatility. The track "Wetin Man Go Do" addresses Nigeria's inner-city struggles. "Dangote", a track recorded in Yoruba, Nigerian pidgin and English, is composed of Fela-jazz horns and African-inflected dancehall; its lyrics stress the importance for ordinary people to hustle. The song is named after Africa's richest man Aliko Dangote and is an angry indictment of poverty in Nigeria.

"Gum Body", a duet with British singer Jorja Smith, is a love ballad that fuses Afrobeats and R&B. The song's instrumental is composed of percussion and sensual jazz sax. The Zlatan-assisted track "Killin Dem" is a blend of Burna Boy's Afro-fusion and Zlatan's cock-sure rap bars. The dancehall and reggae-infused "Omo" interpolates I Wayne's "Can't Satisfy Her"; the track has been described as "a love letter to his girlfriend Stefflon Don". "Collateral Damage", a song about the corruption within Africa, features a guitar-assisted instrumental. The politically charged track "Another Story" narrates the corruption of British colonization. "Pull Up" is composed of scattered strings and percussion. Musically, it contains lyrics about a man's interest in a girl he cannot stop thinking about. In "Different", Burna Boy rhymes about the perils of democracy; the song features vocals by Damian Marley and Angélique Kidjo.

"Gbona" (Yoruba: Hot) was produced by Kel P and is a fusion of Afrobeats and reggae. It was recorded in Nigerian pidgin, Yoruba and Igbo. In a review for Pan African Music, Wale Owoade praised the song's production and said it "thrives on the harmonious fusion of a static sound of the past with an infectious dance vibe from the present". "On the Low" is a mixture of Afrobeats and dancehall; in it, Burna Boy talks about a secret affair that he wants to turn into a lifelong commitment. The song was produced by Kel P and has been described as a mid-tempo love song. Lindsay Howard of Variance magazine said the song is "instantly reminiscent of long days and hot nights". The Future-assisted track "Show & Tell" blends contemporary beats and has a dancehall rhythm. On the album's closing track "Spiritual", Burna Boy samples his mother's acceptance speech at the 2019 BET Awards.

Release and promotion
In April 2019, Burna Boy embarked on the African Giant tour, stopping in several U.S cities and performing at Coachella Valley Music and Arts Festival in California and the Apollo Theater in Harlem, New York City. In July 2019, he announced he would embark on the African Giant Returns tour to support the album. This tour featured live concerts across Canada, the United States, Belgium, the Netherlands, and the United Kingdom. The African Giant Returns tour was scheduled to begin on Friday, August 9, at the Rebel concert venue in Toronto. However, the Rebel gig was cancelled at the last minute and rescheduled for the following Sunday. Writing for Now newspaper, Sumiko Wilson gave the gig a positive review, praising Burna Boy's performance and saying he had "traces of Fela Kuti's signature electric stage presence". Aniefiok Ekpoudom of The Guardian gave a five out of five-star review of the concert at the Wembley Arena in London, writing it "has the feeling of a coronation of Nigeria’s latest musical king".

On September 10, 2019, Burna Boy released the music video for "Gum Body", a duet with British singer Jorja Smith. In the Meji Alabi-directed visuals, the duo are placed in different rooms in an unlit apartment before coming together to dance near a window. Burna Boy released the music video for the M.anifest-assisted track, "Another Story", on September 30, 2019. The video was released a day before Nigeria's independence day and recounts the events surrounding the country's freedom from British rule. In the video, children are wearing blindfolds with the words "corruption", "violence" and "greed" written across them. Another scene in the video depicts children raising weapons and a crowd destroying a burning car.

Singles
"Gbona" was released as the album's lead single on September 27, 2018. The Clarence Peters-directed music video for "Gbona" features Kalukata-influenced female dancers. The album's second single "On the Low" was released on November 16, 2018. Burna Boy won Viewers' Choice award for "On the Low" at the 2020 Soundcity MVP Awards Festival. "On the Low" received 15 million streams in France and was awarded a gold plaque by the National Syndicate of Phonographic Publishing (SNEP). The accompanying music video for "On the Low" was shot and directed by Meji Alabi.

The Zlatan-assisted track "Killin Dem" was released on January 3, 2019, as the album's third single. The Prodigeezy-directed music video for "Killin Dem" incorporates clips from a Zubby Michael Nollywood film and features a mixture of Zanku dance styles. Burna Boy won Best Collaboration for "Killin' Dem" at The Headies 2019. He was also nominated for Best Collaboration and won Song of the Year for "Killin Den" at the 2019 African Muzik Magazine Awards. Moreover, he won Song of the Year and was nominated for Best Collaboration and Listeners' Choice for "Killin Dem" at the 2020 Soundcity MVP Awards Festival.

"Dangote" was released as the album's fourth single on March 1, 2019. The music video for "Dangote" was shot and directed by Clarence Peters; it depicts the desperation of the poor and their oppression. During it, viewers can see an unlicensed pharmacist selling drugs in a public vehicle and a preacher passing around a plate for donations. The New Afrika Shrine is also depicted in the video.

The album's fifth single "Anybody" was released on June 14, 2019. As part of Apple Music's Up Next programming, Burna Boy performed the song on Jimmy Kimmel Live!. A music video directed by Clarence Peters accompanied the song's release. The video features various neon hues and dancers in numerous wardrobes. The Kel P-produced track "Pull Up" was released on July 22, 2019, as the album's sixth single. Burna Boy premiered the song on Zane Lowe's Beats 1 radio show. On August 21, 2019, the music video for the Meji Alabi-directed "Pull Up" was released. In it, Burna Boy displays his vintage aesthetic fashion style.

The album's seventh single "Omo" was released on November 6, 2019, along with its music video. The visuals for "Omo" was directed by Clarence Peters and begins with a shot of Burna Boy sitting on a chair inside a strip club, with the words Giant Club highlighted in neon. The album's eighth single "Secret", a track that features American singer Jeremih and Jamaican dancehall artist Serani, was released on January 24, 2020. The David Camarena-directed video for the song was shot in various dimly lit, monochromatic settings.

Reception

African Giant received positive reviews from music critics. At Metacritic, which assigns a normalized rating out of 100 to reviews from mainstream publications, the album received an average score of 80, based on six reviews. Motolani Alake of Pulse Nigeria assigned a rating of 9.1 out of 10, praising the album's emotive undertone and stating that there is "a uniform sonic approach to all the beats". Alake said African Giant is the "perfection of the journey that Outside pioneered". Sheldon Pearce of Pitchfork gave the record an 8.3 out of 10 rating, saying it is "more cohesive, more robust in sound, and significantly broader than his previous music". Clash magazine's Narzra Ahmed granted the album seven stars out of ten, describing it as "a cohesive piece of work". Spins Israel Daramola commended Burna Boy for not diluting his sound in order to cross into the mainstream.

Kyann-Sian Williams of NME awarded the album four stars out of five, applauding Burna Boy for "using his profile to raise awareness for a better Africa". Kitty Empire of The Observer rated the album four stars out of five, characterizing it as a continuation of "the singer's boundary-hopping mixture of laid-back Caribbean swagger, Fela Kuti swing and multilingual communiques on a range of concerns". Also reviewing for The Guardian, Ben Beaumont-Thomas said the album's "retro Afro-pop production can get generic though, when repeated across 19 tracks" and that Burna Boy's "sensual, even rather muted music, may make it hard for him to cut through the noise of western pop culture". Writing for The Fader magazine, Joey Akan said African Giant is "Nigeria’s biggest homegrown effort with a solid measure of local ownership and a narrative that isn't sacrificed or weakened as a prerequisite for global appeal."

Jochan Embley of the Evening Standard felt the album would be Burna Boy's best work yet if it was more "concise". The Atlantic writer Hannah Giorgis described African Giant as a "musically diverse and narratively challenging" project that "incorporates a potent emphasis on national record-keeping while maintaining the sultry, atmospheric quality that Burna's early records established". August Brown of the Los Angeles Times wrote that the album "never dilutes its sound to cater to Anglo audiences, or even to the hip-hop and R&B scenes that are dabbling in Afro-pop right now." The Faces Summer Eldemire gave the album four stars out of five, saying it feels "political–like a blueprint of Burna's plan to enable Africans to access their own power and uplift the continent." In a review for The Washington Post, Chris Richards stated that on African Giant, Burna Boy's "phrasing always feels fleet, creating a sound that’s incredibly dense and impossibly dainty". Richards also said Burna Boy uses his voice to "give his heaviest lyrics a sense of levity and optimism".

A writer for Filter Free Nigeria said Burna Boy "drew on the positives from Outside while honing the album" and that the "production aligns perfectly to his Afrocentric posture of superiority as it even emboldens even the foreign artistes to ride his wave". In a review for This Day newspaper, Iyke Bede said the record "manages to chronicle a narrative of identity, ambition, activism and love". In contrast, Bede also notes African Giant "certainly isn't aptly titled to reflect Burna's rightful place alongside the galaxy of music stars (King Sunny Adé, Osita Osadebe) that have emerged from the black continent". African Giant won Album of the Year at the 2019 All Africa Music Awards and was nominated for Best World Music Album at the 62nd Annual Grammy Awards.

Year-end rankings

Track listing

Notes
 "—" denotes a skit
 "Anybody" contains a sample of Angelique Kidjo's "We We" (1992).
 "Omo" interpolates I Wayne's "Can't Satisfy Her" (2004).

Personnel

Damini Ogulu  primary artist, writer
Omoniyi Raphael  featured artist, writer
Jorja Alice Smith  featured artist, writer
Jeremy P. Felton  featured artist, writer
Craig Serani Marsh  featured artist, writer
Kwame Ametepee Tsikata  featured artist, writer
Damian "Jr. Gong" Marley  featured artist, writer
Angélique Kidjo  featured artist, writer
Nayvadius DeMun Wilburn  featured artist, writer
Keenon Jackson  featured artist, writer
Kel-P  production 
Peter Jay  production 
Benjamz  production 
Mr Kleb  production 
DJDS  production 
GMK  production 
Chopstix  production 
TMXO  production 
Dre Skull  production 
Skrillex  production 
Levi Lennox  production 
IO  production 
Jesse Ray Ernster  mixing
Joseph Brice  Assistant Engineer
Aran Knight  Assistant Engineer
Harpaal Sanghera  Assistant Engineer

Charts

Weekly charts

Year-end charts

Certifications

Release history

References

2019 albums
Burna Boy albums
Yoruba-language albums
Igbo-language albums
Albums produced by Chopstix